Ferdinand Kitt (22 November 1887 – 5 February 1961) was an Austrian painter. His work was part of the art competitions at the 1928 Summer Olympics and the 1936 Summer Olympics.

References

1887 births
1961 deaths
20th-century Austrian painters
Austrian male painters
Olympic competitors in art competitions
Artists from Vienna
20th-century Austrian male artists